The 2016 Argentina Women's Hockey National Tournament was the 8th edition of the women's national tournament. It was held from 27 to 30 October 2016 in Tucumán, Argentina.

Buenos Aires won the tournament for the third time after defeating Mendoza 2–1 in the final.

Squads
Players followed with a country flag are those involved in its senior national team.

Amateur Field Hockey Association of Buenos Aires

Head Coach: Juan Manuel Casas

 1 - Clara Barberi
 2 - Agustina Metidieri
 3 - Francesca Giovanelli
 4 - Luciana Galimberti
 5 - Mariela Scarone
 6 - Victoria Villalba
 7 - Victoria Granatto
 8 - Geraldine Fresco Pisani ©
 9 - Macarena Rojas
 10 - Ana López Basavilbaso
 11 - Lara Oviedo 
 12 - Sofía Monserrat
 13 - Estefanía Cascallares
 14 - Agustina Habif 
 15 - Mercedes Socino 
 16 - Ivana Dell'Era
 17 - Aldana Hamra
 18 - María José Fernández
 19 - Antonela Rinaldi
 20 - Carolina Azzara

Bahía Blanca's Hockey Association

Head Coach: Jesús Sassi

 1 - Marina Urruti
 2 - Bianca Donati
 3 - Eugenia Nimo
 4 - Bárbara Dichiara
 5 - Florencia Scheverin ©
 6 - Martina Orioli
 7 - Ivana Mazars
 8 - Valentina Zamborain
 9 - Luciana Argüello Acuña
 10 - Valentina Costa Biondi
 11 - Giselle Juárez 
 12 - Rocío Piñeiro
 13 - Marina Urruti
 14 - Itatí Ruilopez
 15 - Gabriela Ludueña
 16 - Hebelén Cavicchioli Cornejo
 17 - Julieta Kluin
 18 - Jordana Buide

Mar del Plata's Hockey Association

Head Coach: Franco Pezzelato

 1 - Julieta Caminiti
 2 - Virginia Badra
 3 - Luz Goñi
 4 - Carolina Labayen
 5 - Manuela Marrone
 6 - Maite Buquicchio
 7 - Carolina Martínez
 8 - Andrea Pedetta ©
 9 - Agustina Álvarez
 10 - Victoria Chioli
 11 - Victoria Zuloaga 
 12 - Agustina Arista
 13 - Camila Morteo
 14 - Eugenia Guerrero
 15 - Soledad Ayesa
 16 - Bianca Marinucci
 17 - Yanina García
 18 - Felicitas Victorel
 19 - Sofía Paglione
 20 - Agustina Buquicchio

Córdoba's Hockey Federation

Head Coach: Miguel Rivera

 1 - Paula Pasquetin
 2 - Florencia Nogueira
 3 - Consuelo Rodríguez Díaz
 4 - Laura González ©
 5 - Paulina Forte
 6 - Sofía Funes
 7 - Celeste Soria
 8 - Ayelén Roldán
 9 - Julieta Jankunas 
 10 - Victoria Aguirre
 11 - Valentina Braconi 
 12 - Agustina D'Ascola
 13 - Sofía Maldonado
 14 - Carmela Briski
 15 - Constanza Ontivero
 16 - Emilia Alonso
 17 - Natalia Galindez
 18 - Magdalena Freites
 19 - Emilia Inaudi
 20 - Magalí Rinaldi

Mendoza's Hockey Association

Head Coach: Lucas Ghilardi

 1 - Florencia Saravia
 2 - Agustina Ricci
 4 - Carla Palta
 5 - Macarena Rodríguez
 6 - Rocío Piña
 7 - Carolina Armani ©
 8 - Julieta Medici
 9 - Sofía Vercelli
 10 - Bárbara Muzaber
 11 - Eugenia Mastronardi 
 12 - Mariana Scandura
 13 - Gabriela Koltes
 14 - Valentina Esley
 15 - Luciana Molina
 16 - Marcela Casale 
 17 - Belén Placeres
 18 - Priscila Jardel
 19 - Sofía Avendaño
 20 - Magdalena González

Misiones Hockey Federation

Head Coach: Mauricio Benitez

 1 - Nayibe Zampaca
 2 - Eliana von der Heyde
 3 - Melisa Figueredo
 4 - Luciana Viarengo
 5 - Noelia Sanabria
 6 - Carla Otonello
 7 - Paula Antueno Quintana
 8 - Lucina von der Heyde © 
 9 - Paula Jara
 10 - Sol Boichuk
 11 - Carla Sabater
 12 - Silvina Barrios
 13 - Florencia Jara
 14 - Victoria Sarjanovich
 15 - Agustina Alcaraz
 16 - Victoria Boichuk
 17 - Magdalena Esquivel
 18 - Constanza González
 19 - Daniela Pegoraro
 20 - Sol Duarte

Litoral's Hockey Federation

Head Coach: Ernesto Morlan

 1 - Flavia Tabia
 2 - Luciana Cerrutti
 3 - Martina Ferrazini
 4 - Ornella Granitto
 5 - Camila Torres
 6 - Yasmin Spinozzi
 7 - Julia Aphalo
 8 - Candelaria Calvo
 9 - Paula Montoya
 10 - Rocío Caldíz ©
 11 - Valentina Bisconti Stringhetti
 12 - Sofía Villarroya
 13 - Victoria Tettamanzi
 14 - Roberta Zuccali
 15 - Cecilia Ricciardino
 16 - Camila Miranda
 17 - Nadín Lacas
 18 - Pilar Larca
 19 - Sofía Mazón
 20 - Bernardita Giosa

Tucumán's Hockey Association

Head Coach: Miguel Dulor

 1 - Sofía Díaz
 2 - Agustina Buti
 3 - Sofía Darnay
 4 - Cecilia Gómez Urrutia
 5 - Victoria Sauze
 6 - Camila Machín
 7 - Nazarena María
 8 - Emilia Albornoz
 9 - Claudia Tejerizo
 10 - Amparo Renta Mora ©
 11 - Lorena Rueda
 12 - Solana Novillo
 13 - Emidia Nuñez López
 14 - Araceli Herrera
 15 - Anahí Totongi
 16 - Florencia Klimbowsky
 17 - Julieta Rodríguez
 18 - Julieta Reverso
 19 - Andrea Strukov
 20 - Sofía Curia

Statistics

Final standings
 Buenos Aires
 Mendoza
 Tucumán
 Mar del Plata
 Córdoba
 Misiones
 Bahía Blanca 
 Rosario

References

2016
2016 in women's field hockey
October 2016 sports events in South America
Hockey